Islitas is a ghost town in southwestern Webb County, Texas, United States.  It was established as a railroad stop and coal shipping center on the Rio Grande and Pecos Valley Railroad in 1882. In 1914 Islitas had its peak population of 300. After 1914 the local mines declined. In 1920 the last census report for the community showed 100 people.

References

Handbook of Texas Online, s.v. "Islitas, Texas" (accessed May 23, 2007)

Geography of Webb County, Texas
Ghost towns in South Texas